The 1948 Argentine Primera División was the 57th season of top-flight football in Argentina. The season began on April 18 and ended on December 12.

Gimnasia y Esgrima (LP) returned to Primera, while no teams were relegated. Independiente won its 5th title.

League standings

References

Argentine Primera División seasons
Argentine Primera Division
Primera Division